Helen French may refer to:

 Helen M. French (1832–1909), American educator
 Helen French (architect) (1900–1994), American architect